Crupina is a small genus of plants in the tribe Cardueae within the family Asteraceae.

The common crupina Crupina vulgaris is a notorious noxious weed on several continents. The other species, Crupina crupinastrum, also has the potential to become weedy, but it is not as bad a pest at the current time. These are thistle-like plants with bright deep pink flower heads.

 Species
 Crupina crupinastrum (Moris) Vis. - southern Europe, northern Africa, southwestern Asia
 Crupina intermedia (Mutel) Walp. - North Africa, Iran, Iraq, Turkey, Armenia
 Crupina pseudocrupina (Mutel) Walp. - Greece
 Crupina strum (Moris) Vis. - Croatia
 Crupina vulgaris Pers. ex Cass. - native to Europe, North Africa, and Asia as far east as Xinjiang; naturalized in China, North America, Australia, etc., and considered a noxious weed in some places

References

External links
 Jepson Manual Treatment
 United States Department of Agriculture Plants Profile

Cynareae
Asteraceae genera